Hypsicrates the historian was a Greek writer in Rome who flourished in the 1st century BC.  His work does not survive, but scholars have conjectures about the writer and his work.  He was associated probably with Pontus and wrote a history of the area that was possibly used by Strabo.  He may be the same Hypsicrates who served as a slave for Julius Caesar and was freed by Caesar in 47 BC.

References
McDonald, Alexander Hugh and Simon Hornblower. "Hypsicrates" in Hornblower, Simon and Antony Spawforth, eds.  The Oxford Classical Dictionary. London: OUP, 2003. p. 739
"Hypsikrates" in Ziegler, Konrat and Walther Sontheimer, eds. Der kleine Pauly. Munich: Artemis Verlag, 1975.

1st-century BC Greek people
1st-century BC Romans
1st-century BC historians
Ancient Greeks in Rome
Greek-language historians from the Roman Empire
Ancient Pontic Greeks
Historians from Roman Anatolia